Georg Wildhagen (15 September 1920 – 2 December 1990) was a German screenwriter and film director. According to conflicting sources he was born in either Hannover or in Hamburg.

Selected filmography
 The Marriage of Figaro (1949)
 The Dubarry (1951)
 The Merry Wives of Windsor (1950)
 A Night in Venice (1953)
 Wedding Bells (1954)

References

Bibliography
 Davidson, John & Hake, Sabine. Take Two: Fifties Cinema in Divided Germany. Berghahn Books, 2007.

External links

1920 births
1990 deaths
Film people from Hanover
Television people from Lower Saxony
German male writers
Male screenwriters
20th-century screenwriters